{{Infobox country
|conventional_long_name = 
|native_name = KleinvrijstaatKlein Vrystaat
|common_name = Klein Vrystaat
|empire      = South Africa
|status      = Boer Republic
|government_type = Republic
|event_start = Founding of Klein Vrystaat
|year_start  = 1886
|date_start  = 
|event_end   = Annexed by the South African Republic
|year_end    = 1891
|date_end    = 2 August
|event_post  = 
|date_post   = 
|p1          = Swazi people
|p2          = 
|flag_p1     = 
|s1          = South African Republic
|flag_s1     = Flag of Transvaal.svg
|image_flag  = Flag of Klein Vrystaat.svg
|image_coat  = Klein Vrystaat seal.jpg
|flag_type   = Flag
|image_map   = 
|image_map_caption  = 
|capital     = Vaalkop Farm
|title_leader= Triumvirate
|leader1     =  J.J. Bezuidenhout, W.A. du Plessis and A.E.L. Botha
|year_leader1= 
|leader2     = 
|year_leader2= 
|legislature = Triumvirate
|national_motto   = 
|national_anthem  = 
|common_languages = Dutch
|religion    = Dutch ReformedDutch Reformed dissenters
|currency    = South African pound (£)
}} (Afrikaans for "Little Free State") was a short-lived Boer republic in what is now South Africa (around the town of Piet Retief).

History

From around 1876, a group of Boers lived on land bought from the Swazi king Mbandzeni. In 1886, a formal government was formed, following the adoption of a constitution.

King Mbandzeni sold the land but kept his kingdom. He was another son of Mswati II, ruling from 1875 to 1889.

This state existed until 1891 when it was incorporated into the South African Republic (Transvaal). The flag of the Klein Vrystaat is almost identical to the Transvaal's own : a horizontal red-white-blue triband with a vertical green stripe near the hoist. The difference between the two lies in that the width of the green stripe was equal to the height of the horizontal stripes in the Klein Vrystaat flag, and a quarter thicker in the Transvaal flag.

The KVS was mainly a white (largely Afrikaner) community located on Swazi-owned land along the kingdom's southwestern border with the Transvaal, which was granted in 1877 by iNgwenyama Mbandzeni Dlamini to two hunters: Joachim Johannes Ferreira and Frans Ignatius Maritz. What Mbandzeni thought he had granted was in the nature of a permanent grazing concession, but Ferreira and Maritz opened up the territory to Afrikaner settlement and subdivided into small farms. Mbandzeni finally gave them the permission to form their own labndla (council), which led to their establishment of a local government, consisting of a president and council, with its own constitution and laws.

In 1886, the settlers declared their independence as the Little Free State and were able to rebuff Mbandzeni's halfhearted attempts to evict them on the grounds that they had exceeded his mandate. In 1888, Ferreira and Maritz requested that the South African Republic (ZAR) incorporate them into the Transvaal, claiming that Mbandzeni had renounced his authority over them. At that point, Mbandzeni reasserted his sovereignty over the territory and demanded an annual rental payment of £21, but, by then, it was too late. By the terms of the first Swaziland Convention (1890), the Little Free State was incorporated into the ZAR, with the accord of the British, as part of the Piet Retief, Mpumalanga district.

However, the creation of the Nieuwe Republiek Zuid Afrika in 1884, and the Klein Vrystaat in Swaziland 1886 as a miniature republic. In each case, use was made of tribal warfare among the African population to introduce a small army of Europeans, who, having defeated one of the contenders in the tribal war, exacted their price, in land, from the victor.

In addition, the Europeans arrived in greater numbers throughout the 1880s, after the discovery of gold in neighboring Transvaal and at Piggs Peak and Forbes Reef in Swaziland. Mswati's son, Mbandzeni, granted large chunks of his territory in concessions to the new arrivals, emboldening Britain to ignore his claims to most of the rest, and, by the time Swaziland became a protectorate of the South African Republic in 1894, there was precious little land left. After their victory in the Second Anglo-Boer War, Britain assumed control of the territory and retained it until 1968.

The Swazi saw the Zulus' refusal to allow white farmers, traders and missionaries to penetrate their land, leading to Britain's destruction of the Zulu monarchy in 1879. In the 1880s, King Mbandzeni granted numerous concessions to Boer graziers, and British traders and miners. This amounted to a "paper conquest" of Swaziland.

After the Zulu War, the Swazis aided the British in dismantling the Pedi Kingdom. In gratitude, Britain promised the Swazis they would retain their independence. This was despite the "scramble for Africa" in the 1880s.

In 1886, the discovery of gold made the Transvaal the prime force in southern Africa. The Boers demanded British agreement to their expansion either north across the Limpopo (Rhodesia-Zimbabwe) or east through Swaziland (the road to the sea). Britain reversed its position on Swazi independence and by 1894 had allowed the Transvaal to establish control over Swaziland.

See also
 The Orange Free State: the larger  during the time of Klein Vrystaat

Footnotes

References
 Alan R. Booth. Historical Dictionary of Swaziland Second Edition. The Scarecrow Press, Inc. London 2000. pp. 150–151.
 A.J. Christopher. Land Policy in Southern Africa During the Nineteenth Century. Department of Geography, University of Port Elizabet. pp. 6–7.
 "The Rough Guide to South Africa." Rough Guides'''. 2007. Feb. 26 2008.<http://www.roughguides.com>.
 Richard M. Patricks. "Swazi History Olden Times to 1900". SNTC. July 2000. Feb. 26 2008.<http://www.sntc.org>.

External links
Klein Vrystaat at Flags of the World

States and territories disestablished in 1891
Former countries in Africa
Former republics
19th century in Africa
States and territories established in 1886
1886 establishments in Africa
1886 establishments in South Africa